Charles Chalmers is an American saxophonist, session musician, backup singer, songwriter and producer.  He has written several hit songs for many recording artists, and has also arranged and performed on many Grammy winning recordings. Seven of those recordings are in the Grammy Hall of Fame:  Al Green's "Let's Stay Together"; Aretha Franklin's "Respect," "Chain of Fools" and "Natural Woman"; Dusty Springfield's "Son of a Preacher Man"; and Wilson Pickett's "Mustang Sally" and "Land of a Thousand Dances."  He also holds an Album of the Century award for his work on Aretha Franklin's, I Never Loved a Man the Way I Love You.

Biography
Charlie Chalmers began playing music in his high school marching band.

By age 19, he had toured with Jerry Lee Lewis and worked extensively with Charlie Rich.

Chalmers came to the attention of Bill Black, who called Chalmers for a session. Not long after working with Black, Willie Mitchell asked Chalmers to play on some of his recordings. Chalmers played lead sax on Mitchell's instrumental, "Soul Serenade". Mitchell then called Chalmers to work regularly on his productions, not only as a saxophone player, but also as an arranger and back up singer. Chalmers helped arrange and sang backup on "Let's Stay Together" by Al Green with a group that came to be called Rhodes, Chalmers, & Rhodes. They also sang on Green's album, I Can't Stop, produced by Mitchell, for Blue Note Records, (2003).

Before recording with Al Green, Chalmers was asked to go to Muscle Shoals, Alabama, to play on a Wilson Pickett recording date for Atlantic Records. "Land of a Thousand Dances" and "Mustang Sally" were two of the songs he recorded with Pickett that week, and it was then that Chalmers met Jerry Wexler and Tom Dowd. Chalmers arranged the horns and played sax on many Aretha Franklin songs, including "I Ain't Never Loved A Man", "Respect", "Do Right Woman", "Chain of Fools", "Dr. Feel Good", and "Natural Woman".

Rick Hall, of Fame Recording, also greatly influenced Chalmers' career producing for Chess Records, Chalmers' Sax and the Single Girl.

After Chalmers sang on Paul Anka's hit "(You're) Having My Baby", he performed live dates with Anka in Las Vegas for three years at Caesar's Palace. Chalmers located a studio in Las Vegas, where he sang back up on a Frank Sinatra session.

After working for several years in Vegas, Charlie and his group were called to Miami to do some sessions at Criteria Studios. For the next few years, they recorded with artists including Andy Gibb, The Bee Gees, Fire Fall, Harry Chapin, John Mellencamp and K. C. and the Sunshine Band.

In 1989, Mel Tillis asked Chalmers to work with him at his new theatre in Branson, Missouri. After two years, Chalmers built a recording studio in Branson.

Charlie Chalmers now resides in Branson, Missouri, where he produces in his studio, "Branson Recording & Music Productions".  He recorded a new saxophone album called Horn of History.

Chalmers is married to Josie and in 2008 they had a son.

Songs
As a songwriter and music publisher, Charlie Chalmers had a #1 hit record by Conway Twitty: "The Clown". Also among Chalmers' songs are "One Woman", on the Isaac Hayes album Hot Buttered Soul, and "One Big Unhappy Family", on the album The Isaac Hayes Movement. Both albums are double Platinum sellers.  "Alice Is In Wonderland" is on The Oak Ridge Boys' Deliver. Al Green also recorded "One Woman" on his Green Is Blues album. The Staple Singers recorded "City In The Sky" for their City In The Sky album, Boz Scaggs recorded "Look What I Got" on his self-titled Atlantic album Boz Scaggs, and Etta James recorded the popular "It Hurts Me So Much" on the album Tell Mama for Chess Records.

External links

http://www.charliechalmers.com
[ Charlie's Allmusic entry]

American saxophonists
Living people
Year of birth missing (living people)
21st-century saxophonists